Mekameleen TV (Arabic: قناة مكملين)  is an Egyptian opposition TV channel broadcast on Qatar owned satellite Es'hail 2. It is  based in Istanbul, Turkey.

See also
 El Sharq
 2013 Egyptian coup d'état

References

External links

Arabic-language television stations
Television in Egypt
Television stations in Egypt
2013 establishments in Turkey